The Oshawa Dodgers were an independent, minor league baseball team of the semi-pro Intercounty Baseball League based in Oshawa, Ontario.  They played their home games at Kinsmen Stadium.

The team was founded by local amateur baseball coach Troy May and began play in the 2002 season. In addition to owning the Dodgers, May managed the club for their first four seasons before passing over the managerial duties to Mike Prosper in 2006.

Troy May died during the final week of the 2006 season on July 19, four days after being involved in a serious automobile accident.

Following the 2009 season, the Dodgers announced that they would be suspending all baseball operations indefinitely. The lack of fan support and high cost of operating the team were ownership's primary concerns.

External links 
Oshawa Dodgers

Sport in Oshawa
Intercounty Baseball League
Baseball teams established in 2002
Baseball teams in Ontario
2002 establishments in Ontario
Baseball teams disestablished in 2009
2009 disestablishments in Ontario